A promotional postal order (PPO) is a special type of postal order that is issued in the United Kingdom by various companies in conjunction with the Royal Mail to promote their goods and services. These have been issued at various times since the 1970s.

List of companies known to have issued PPOs

Cinzano
Smash
Nescafé
Typhoo
Reader's Digest
Maxwell House
Bounce (fabric softener)
Swan
Brooke Bond Teas
Persil
Kleenex

Post Marketing Surveillance Unit
Berkeley
Philips
Boehringer
Tango
General Guarantee
Fife Council (These are the only Scots postal orders.)
Uplands
Argos

References

 Michael Brill British Postal Orders, 1881-2005.
 L.J. Clark A Catalogue of British Postal Orders 1881-1991
 Howard Lunn Illustrated History of Promotional Postal Orders
 Postal Order News

See also

 Postal orders of the United Kingdom

Currencies of England
Currencies of Scotland
Currencies of the United Kingdom
Postal orders
Postal system of the United Kingdom